Djediouia or جديوية is a town and commune located at 35°5'46 "north, 0°49'50"east in Relizane Province, Algeria and the presumed site of Ancient city and bishopric Catabum Castra, now a Latin Catholic titular see.. by 2008 this had risen to 33,835 and a population density of 254 inhabitants/km2.

History 
The Roman town Catabum Castra was important enough in the Roman province of Mauretania Caesariensis to become a suffragan bishopric of its capital Caesarea in Mauretania's Metropolitan Archbishop. 
Under the French it was known as Saint Aimé.

References

Source and External links 
 GigaCatholic with titular incumbent biography links

Communes of Relizane Province